Tarata may refer to:

Geography
Tarata, Peru, a city in the Tarata Province, Tacna Region, Peru
Tarata District, a district in the Tarata Province, Peru
Tarata Province, a province in the Tacna Region, Peru
Tarata, Cochabamba, a town in the Cochabamba Department, Bolivia
Tarata Municipality, a municipal section of the Esteban Arce Province, Cochabamba Department, Bolivia
 Tărâţa, a village in the commune of Pârjol, Bacău County, Romania
Tarata statistical area, a census division in Taranaki, New Zealand

Other uses
Tarata bombing, a terrorist attack in Peru in 1992
Tarata, the Māori common name for the New Zealand native tree Pittosporum eugenioides